The Munster Senior Hurling League (known in some years as the Munster Hurling Cup) is an annual hurling competition organised by the Munster Council of the Gaelic Athletic Association since 2016 for the top inter-county teams in the province of Munster in Ireland.

The series of games are played during January. The Munster Senior Hurling League is effectively a pre-season tournament. It allows teams to blood new players and to experiment prior to the opening of the National Hurling League.

2019 was the first year that all six eligible teams participated in the Munster Senior Hurling League. Participation or non-participation can be decided on an annual basis. Cork are the current champions.

Format

In the tournament's first three years, each team played all the others once in a single round-robin system (of 4 or 5 county teams), with the top two teams progressing to the final. In 2019 and 2020, all six counties competed, and they were drawn into two separate groups, with the two group winners meeting in the final.

In 2022 the competition was a straight knockout, with 5 teams, and was called the "Munster Hurling Cup". For 2023 the competition returned to the format of 2020, with two groups of three teams.

Stadia

As of the 2022 season, Munster League hurling has been played in eleven stadiums since the formation of the league in 2016.

While the traditional county grounds are sometimes used for league matches, smaller club grounds have usually been used for games which may not have had such a high profile.

Munster League matches are usually played on a rolling home and away basis.

The stadiums for the 2017 league showed a large disparity in capacity: Gaelic Grounds, the home ground of Limerick has a capacity of 50,500 with O'Garney Park, one of the grounds used by Clare, having a capacity of 7,000. The combined total capacity of the Munster League in the 2017 season was 111,000.

Stadium attendances are a significant source of regular income for the Munster Council and the individual county boards.

Roll of honour

Wins by county

List of finals

Top scorers

All time

Overall

Single game

Finals

References

 
Hurling cup competitions in Munster
Munster GAA inter-county hurling competitions